Losang Jamcan, also spelled Losang Gyaltsen (born July 1957), is a Chinese politician of Tibetan ethnicity. He is the chairman of the Tibet Autonomous Region People's Congress Standing Committee, and former Chairman (governor) of Tibet Autonomous Region and Mayor of Tibetan capital Lhasa.

Career
Losang Jamcan was born in Zhag'yab County, Chamdo Prefecture in eastern Tibet. From December 1971 to February 1976 he attended Tibet University for Nationalities in Xianyang, Shaanxi province, studying Literature. After graduating he worked at the university for 10 years as an instructor and an official of the school Communist Youth League.

In December 1986 Losang Jamcan returned to his native Tibet, where he was the Secretary of the Communist Youth League of the autonomous region. From 1992 to 1995 he served as the Deputy Communist Party Chief and Commissioner of Nagqu Prefecture in northern Tibet. In June 1995 he was transferred to the Tibetan capital Lhasa to be its Deputy Party Chief. He was appointed acting mayor in September 1995, and became Mayor of Lhasa in May 1996. From 2001 to 2004 he was enrolled in the part-time postgraduate program of the Central Party School of the Chinese Communist Party, studying Marxist philosophy.

In January 2003 Losang Jamcan was promoted to Vice Chairman of Tibet Autonomous Region, and Executive Vice Chairman in May 2010. On 29 January 2013 he was elected Chairman of Tibet by the Tibet Autonomous Regional People's Congress, succeeding Padma Choling, who became chairman of the standing committee of the congress. As the regional chairman he is subordinate to Chen Quanguo, the Communist Party Chief and top official of Tibet. On 15 January 2017, he was elected as the President of Tibet Autonomous Region People's Congress Standing Committee.

Losang Jamcan has been a member of the 18th and 19th Central Committees of the Chinese Communist Party.

References

Living people
1957 births
Chinese Communist Party politicians from Tibet
Mayors of Lhasa
Members of the 18th Central Committee of the Chinese Communist Party
Members of the 19th Central Committee of the Chinese Communist Party
Members of the Standing Committee of the 13th National People's Congress
People from Chamdo
People's Republic of China politicians from Tibet
Political office-holders in Tibet
Tibet Minzu University alumni